Rarities (typeset as [Rarities] on the artwork) is the fourth album, and first compilation, by the Minneapolis punk rock band The Soviettes. It is a selection of the group's lesser-known material, including their early EPs.  It was released free on the internet and also in vinyl LP format.

Track listing
"Hot Sauced and Peppered" – 2:34
"In the Red" – 1:21
"Go Lambs Go!" – 1:58
"Sandbox" – 1:25
"Matt's Song (Split Version)" – 2:46
"Sixty Days" – 2:03
"Latchkey" – 2:51
"Sunday AM" – 2:51
"The Nine To Life" – 2:35
"gossip@whogivesashit.com" – 1:53
"Twin Cities Sound" – 1:55
"30 Minutes or Less" – 1:37
"Mazacon" – 1:45
"Alright" – 1:33
"Plus One" – 1:19
"Old Man Reading a Book" – 1:59
"The Best of Me" – 1:33
"LPIII Original Intro" – 1:09

Additional information
Tracks 1 to 4 are from May 2002's T.C.C.P. EP.
Tracks 5 to 10 are from November 2002's split EP with The Valentines.
Track 11 is from the 2002 Havoc Records compilation "No Hold Back; All Attack" 
Tracks 12 & 13 are from 2003's split EP with The Havenot's.
Tracks 14 & 15 are from the 2004 single "Alright".
Tracks 16 to 18 are unused demos from the recording sessions for LP III.

Personnel
Annie Holoien – guitar, vocals
Maren "Sturgeon" Macosko – guitar, vocals
Susy Sharp – bass guitar, vocals
Danny Henry – drums, vocals (tracks 5 to 18)
Lane Pederson - drums, vocals (tracks 1 to 4)

Reception
News of the album was reported and/or reviewed by Minnesota's "City Pages", Reviler magazine, Punk News, the Minneapolis Examiner, the A/V Club (twice)  and the Twin Cities' Vita.mn magazine site.

References

External links
The Soviettes on Myspace
Red Sound Records free download site

The Soviettes albums
2010 albums